The Australian Graduate School of Leadership (AGSL), formerly the International Marketing Institute of Australia (IMIA) is a privately-owned centre for postgraduate business studies based in Sydney, New South Wales, offering online courses.

History
In 1970 the International Marketing Institute of Australia (IMIA) was formed by Amatil, APM Australia, CSR Limited, ICI Australia and the Bank of New South Wales. The faculty was originally run by the Harvard and other business schools, with a strong Australian focus introduced in the late 1980s, and in 1990 IMIA became an independent centre for postgraduate strategic business studies. The Sydney CBD campus was opened the following year.

IMIA became the Australian Graduate School of Leadership (AGSL) in 2010, with the IMIA Centre for Strategic Business Studies as a subsidiary business.

Courses
IMIA offers its Doctor of Business Leadership at Torrens University Australia, and also offers short courses and other services. All courses are conducted online.

References

Australian vocational education and training providers
Organizations established in 1970
Universities in Sydney